"Sunshine Day" is a song recorded by British progressive rock group Jethro Tull and released as the A-side of the group's debut single. It was recorded on 6-7 January 1968 at CBS Studios in London, and the single released on 16 February 1968 by MGM Records, in the UK only. The B-side, "Aeroplane", was recorded on 22 October 1967 at EMI Studios, London, under the artist name "John Evan Band". Both tracks were produced by Derek Lawrence, who is also credited with purposely designating the band as Jethro Toe. Apparently, he did not like the name "Jethro Tull".

"Sunshine Day" was written by Mick Abrahams, who joined the band in late 1967. The composers of "Aeroplane" were Ian Anderson and "Len Barnard", the latter a pseudonym for Tull bass player Glenn Cornick (born Glenn Douglas Barnard Cornick). The release sold close to one hundred copies, mostly to friends and relatives. Jethro Tull would begin recording their first album, This Was, in June 1968.

Personnel
Jethro Tull (credited as 'Jethro Toe')
 Ian Anderson – lead vocals
 Glenn Cornick – bass guitar
 Mick Abrahams – vocals, guitar
 Clive Bunker – drums

Additional personnel
 Derek Lawrence - producer
 Mike Ross - engineer

Recorded appearances
Rare Tracks (1975)
20 Years of Jethro Tull (1988)
25 Very Rare Masters from the Sixties (1996)
1968: The Soundtrack (2004)
Real Life Permanent Dreams: A Cornucopia of British Psychedlia 1965-1970 (2007)
Spirit of Joy: Tales from the Polydor Underground 1967-1974 (2008)

References

External links
 Sunshine Day at discogs

1968 debut singles
Jethro Tull (band) songs
1968 songs
MGM Records singles